The North Western State Trail is a  rail trail located in Northern Lower Michigan. It starts on the other side of Petoskey connecting to Little Traverse Wheelway and ends at North Central State Trail Mackinaw City. From Alanson to Mackinaw City is a mixture of railroad ballast, mixed dirt and stone. The rest of the trail will be improved over time.

References

Rail trails in Michigan